The Stockholm Sweden Temple is the 34th operating temple of the Church of Jesus Christ of Latter-day Saints.

The temple sits on a  lot with six spires rising above the pines in the nearby forest. A cobblestone path leads to its doors. The temple serves Latter-day Saints from the countries of Sweden, Norway, and Latvia.

The area surrounding the temple is known for its Iron Age burial grounds, including Jordbro Grave Field. The temple itself was built on a part of the ancient Åby Grave Field (Åbygravfältet).

History
The April 1981 announcement of the Stockholm Sweden Temple was received with virtually no opposition. There were numerous sites explored for the building of the temple, but the one decided upon by church leaders was in Västerhaninge in Haninge Municipality, just south of Stockholm. Municipal officials and merchants welcomed the temple project, and later the Municipality showed further support by changing the name of the street on which the temple is located to Tempelvägen ("The Temple Road"). The Stockholm Sweden Temple was dedicated by Gordon B. Hinckley on July 2, 1985.

On July 29, 1988, an explosion, caused by a bomb placed outside the temple, caused minor damage to a side door of the structure. In 2020, like all the church's other temples, the Stockholm Sweden Temple was closed in response to the coronavirus pandemic.

See also

 Comparison of temples of The Church of Jesus Christ of Latter-day Saints
 List of temples of The Church of Jesus Christ of Latter-day Saints
 List of temples of The Church of Jesus Christ of Latter-day Saints by geographic region
 Temple architecture (Latter-day Saints)
 The Church of Jesus Christ of Latter-day Saints in Sweden

References
 "The First 100 Temples", Chad Hawkins, 2001, p 95

External links
 
 Official Stockholm Sweden Temple page
 Stockholm Sweden Temple page

20th-century Latter Day Saint temples
Buildings and structures in Stockholm
Christianity in Stockholm
Religious buildings and structures in Sweden
Religious buildings and structures completed in 1985
Temples (LDS Church) in Europe
The Church of Jesus Christ of Latter-day Saints in Sweden
1985 establishments in Sweden